Primitive Enema is the debut album by L.A. punk band Butt Trumpet.  It was produced by Geza X and released in 1994 by Chrysalis Records.

Reception

AllMusic's Stephen Thomas Erlewine gave the album 2/5 stars called the group "crude and amateurish-and fiercely proud of it, by the way", and said the disc "made more sense on a smaller label".  He also criticized Geza X's production, calling it "...slightly too clean to make Primitive Enema sound dangerous."

Track listing
All songs written by Butt Trumpet.
 "Clusterfuck" 1:51
 "Funeral Crashing Tonight" 2:02
 "I've Been So Mad Lately" 2:16
 "Dicktatorship" 3:24
 "Classic Asshole" 2:27
 "Decapitated" 0:40
 "Dead Dogs" 1:08
 "I Left My Flannel In Seattle" 1:32
 "I'm Ugly And I Don't Know Why" 3:10
 "The Grindcore Song" 0:49
 "Primitive Enema" 2:01
 "I Left My Gun In San Francisco" 1:14
 "Shut Up" 1:58
 "Ten Seconds Of Heaven" 1:22
 "Yesterday" 2:33
 "Ode To Dickhead" 0:52
 "Pink Gun" 1:35
 "Blind" 5:18

Personnel

Butt Trumpet
Bianca Butthole: vocals, bass
Sharon Needles: vocals, bass
Thom Bone: bass, occasional vocal backing, ego
Blare N. Bitch: guitars, vocal backing
Jerry Geronimo: drums, percussion, cymbals, vocal backing

Additional personnel
Geza X., Jamie Schene, Andrea Beltramo (a.k.a. "The Butt Trumpettes"): vocal backing

Production
Arranged By Butt Trumpet
Produced By Thom Bone, with additional production by Geza X (deliberate error in liner notes is an inside joke)
Recorded & Mixed By Geza X & Thom Bone, July 31-August 2 (per liner notes "real cheap")
CD and cassette tape mastered By Dave Collins, Patricia Sullivan & Thom Bone; vinyl mastered By Bill Lightner & Thom Bone at A&M Studios and K-Disc in Hollywood, CA
All Songs Published By Buttwrenching Music.

References

External links
Primitive Enema at AllMusic

1994 debut albums
Butt Trumpet albums
Chrysalis Records albums
Albums produced by Geza X